is a Japanese manga series written and illustrated by Saisō. It began serialization in Kodansha's Palcy manga website and app in October 2019.

Publication
Written and illustrated by Saisō, She is My Knight began serialization in Kodansha's Palcy manga website on October 22, 2019. It has been collected in three volumes as of November 2022. The series is licensed in English by Kodansha USA.

See also
Uchi no Kaisha no Chiisai Senpai no Hanashi, another manga series by Saisō

References

External links
 

Japanese webcomics
Kodansha manga
Shōjo manga
Webcomics in print